Indian Hills may refer to:

Places in the United States

 Indian Hills, Colorado
 Indian Hills, Indiana
 Indian Hills, Wichita, Kansas
 Indian Hills, Kentucky
 Indian Hills, Nevada
 Indian Hills, New Mexico
 Indian Hills, Texas
 Indian Hills, Wisconsin

Other uses
 Indian Hills Community College, Ottumwa and Centerville, Iowa
 Indian Hills Theater, Omaha, Nebraska

See also
 Indian Hills High School (disambiguation)
 Indian Hill (disambiguation)